St Martin's GAA may refer to:

St Martin's GAA (Kilkenny), a sports club in the Ballyfoyle/Coon/Muckalee area, Ireland
St Martin's GAA (Wexford), a sports club in Murrintown, Ireland
St Martin's GAA (Carlow), a sports club

See also
Naomh Máirtín CPG, a sports club in Monasterboice, County Louth